Clemence Edward Morden (22 May 1907 – 26 March 1987) was  a former Australian rules footballer who played with St Kilda and Collingwood in the Victorian Football League (VFL).

Family
The son of John Patrick Morden, and Honora Morden, née O'Brien, Clemence Edward Morden was born at Korumburra, Victoria on 22 May 1907.

His brother, Jim Morden, played for St Kilda in the VFL, and his brother-in-law, Jack O'Rourke, played with St Kilda and Fitzroy in the VFL.

He married Nancy Adelaide Forbes (1912-1973) in 1934.

Notes

References
 Players' Movements, The Age, (Wednesday, 24 March 1937), p.13.

External links 

		
Clem Morden's profile at Collingwood Forever

1907 births
1987 deaths
Australian rules footballers from Victoria (Australia)
St Kilda Football Club players
Collingwood Football Club players